The Makere  are an ethnic group of the Democratic Republic of the Congo, living near the Bima River in the Northern part of the country. They speak the Mangbetu language.

References

External links

Ethnic groups in the Democratic Republic of the Congo